The anime series Buso Renkin is based on the manga series of the same name written by Nobuhiro Watsuki. The series is directed by Takao Kato and produced by Xebec. The episodes follow Kazuki Muto who becomes an Alchemic warrior in the battle against Alchemic monsters known as Homunculi.

The production of the Buso Renkin anime was announced by the release of a minute-long internet trailer. Buso Renkin aired between October 5, 2006, and March 29, 2007, on TV Tokyo. The episodes were later released in nine DVD compilations between January 25, 2007, and September 21, 2007 by Geneon Universal Entertainment. A DVD box set containing the whole series was released on November 26, 2009.

On December 8, 2007, Viz Media announced the production of the English dub which would be released in two DVD sets of thirteen episodes each. The first set containing episodes one to thirteen was released on April 29, 2008, and the second set contains episodes fourteen to twenty-six and was released on October 7, 2008. On December 20, 2009, the first three episodes from the series were officially uploaded to Hulu and Viz Media's portal. Two episodes were uploaded weekly thereafter with the final episode uploaded on March 8, 2010. Beginning October 2, 2012, Buso Renkin was streamed on Neon Alley.

The series use three pieces of theme music: a single opening theme and two ending themes.



Production team
Buso Renkins original work was created by Nobuhiro Watsuki in the form of a manga. The anime series was produced by Xebec and directed by Takao Kato. The series was planned by Kazuhiko Torishima, Akihiro Kawamura, Koji Kumozu, and Yukinao Shijimoji. The producers were Makota Oyoshi, Nobuhiro Nakayama, Shinichi Ikeda, Hinoyuki Yonemasu and executive producers were Naoko Watanabe and Kohei Kawase. Nobuyoshi Habara directed the opening and ending themes and its animation was directed by Akio Takami. Keito Watanabe directed the art of the series, Natsuyo Ban coordinated the colors, Takuya Matsumura designed the animation for the weapons, and Sunao Chikako designed the props. The sound was directed by Takeshi Takadara; sound effects were done by Mitsuru Kageyama, mixed by Naotsugu Uchida, edited by Akane Sango, and recorded at Half H-P Studio.

On December 8, 2007, Viz Media announced that Buso Renkin would receive an English localization and be released in two DVD sets. The production for the dubbing was coordinated by Marc Schmidt and recorded at Salami Studios located in Hollywood. The cast of the English dub was overseen by Rene Veilleux. The English script was written by her along with Donald Roman Lopez. The automated dialogue replacement mixing was done by Mark Mecado, Johnathan Palomo Abelardo, Jeff Kettle, and Josh Huber.

Episode list

Volume DVDs

Japanese release
Geneon Universal Entertainment released nine DVD compilations between January 25, 2007 and September 21, 2007 in Japan. A DVD box set containing all twenty-six episodes was released on November 26, 2009.

North American release
Viz Media released the English dub of the series in two DVD compilations which contain thirteen episodes each.

Notes and references
Notes
 The official website of Buso Renkin informs episodes aired between October 4, 2006, and March 28, 2007 at the 25:00 AM timeslot. This, technically, means that the show was broadcast always a day later than what is featured on the site.
 The episode's title used English lettering in the Japanese airing.

General references

Specific references

Buso Renkin